The second season of Canada's Got Talent, a reality television series, premiered on March 22, 2022 on Citytv. Unlike America's Got Talent, the show only had the audition round, semi-finals and then the finale.

The season was won by Jeanick Fournier, a singer from Saguenay, Quebec.

Format

Auditions 
The auditions took place in front of the judges and a live audience. At any time during the audition, the judges showed their disapproval of the act by pressing a buzzer, which lights a large red "X" on the stage. If all the judges pressed their buzzers, the act must end. Voting worked on a majority-of-three basis, where three positive votes from the judges were required. The Golden Buzzer is placed in the center of the stage, and each judge (or the host) can only press the Golden Buzzer once each, sending an act straight to the semi-finals.

In the final audition episode before the semi-finals, the dance troupe The Renegades received a special collective golden buzzer from all four judges and Ell. This was only the second time in the history of the franchise in North America that this occurred, following young singer Victory Brinker in the 16th season of America's Got Talent.

Semi-finals 
The semi-finals and final were broadcast through three episodes, two semi-finals and one finale. Judges could still end a performance early with three X's. The acts competed for two judge votes that send them straight to the finals, and the rest compete for a Canada-wide vote that dictates the rest of the finalists. The judges were asked to express their views on each act's performance. Phone lines, Twitter, Facebook, texting and online voting platforms opened for a one-hour after all acts performed. The public voted for the act they thought was the best. Voters could submit a total of fifty votes (ten in each platform). After the votes were counted, the act that polled the highest number of public votes, automatically was placed in the final. The judges then chose between the second and third most popular acts, with the winner of that vote also gaining a place in the final. All other acts were then eliminated from the competition.

Judges and host 

It was announced in October 2021 that Kardinal Offishall, Trish Stratus, Lilly Singh and Howie Mandel would serve as judges for the show, with Lindsay Ell as host. The semi-finals later would employ a reduced panel with actor/director Jason Priestley sitting in for both Offishall and Stratus; Stratus reported on her Instagram account that she had contracted COVID-19 the week of the semi-finals taping and thus had to isolate, while Offishall was away for undisclosed reasons.

Simon Cowell, the creator and executive producer of the franchise and a judge in the British and American editions, is not a regular judge of the competition but appeared on the judging panel for the finale.

Broadcasting 
Because of the various time zones in Canada, only viewers in the provinces and territories east of Manitoba saw the show live (in the Newfoundland, Atlantic and Eastern time zones). All other areas in Canada broadcast the show on a tape delay basis. All Citytv stations aired the show at 8:00 p.m. (in each time zone where there is a Citytv station) with the Toronto station airing the program at 8:00 p.m. Viewers in Newfoundland saw the show live at 9:30 p.m., and viewers in the Atlantic region at 9:00 p.m., because there is no Citytv station in these provinces to broadcast the show at local time. The same process occurred with the results show.

Season overview 

  |  | 
  |  |  Golden Buzzer Audition

Semi-finals summary 
Offishall and Stratus were absent for both semi-final episodes, so there were only 3 judges (Priestley, Singh, and Mandel).
 Buzzed Out |  |

Semi-final 1 (May 3)

Guest judge: Jason Priestley

Semi-final 2 (May 10)

Guest judge: Jason Priestley

Live Final (May 17)
Guest judge: Simon Cowell

 |  |  |

Production 
The season is filmed in the Avalon Theatre in Fallsview Casino Resort. It is produced by McGillivray Entertainment, Fremantle and Rogers Sports & Media. Sponsors of the program include Tim Hortons, CIBC, Walmart, Activia, and Air Miles.

Ratings

References

External links 
 

2022 Canadian television seasons
2